Perm, previously known as Yagoshikha (1723–1781), and Molotov (1940–1957), is the largest city and the administrative centre of Perm Krai, Russia. Perm is the fifteenth-largest city in Russia, and the fifth-largest city in the Volga Federal District.

In 1723, a copper-smelting works was founded at the village of Yagoshikha. In 1781 the settlement of Yagoshikha became the town of Perm. Perm's position on the navigable Kama River, leading to the Volga, and on the Siberian Route across the Ural Mountains, helped it become an important trade and manufacturing centre. It also lay along the Trans-Siberian Railway. Perm grew considerably as industrialization proceeded in the Urals during the Soviet period, and in 1940 was named Molotov in honour of Vyacheslav Molotov. In 1957 the city returned to its historical name.

Modern Perm is still a major railway hub and one of the chief industrial centers of the Urals region. The city's diversified metallurgical and engineering industries produce equipment and machine tools for the petroleum and coal industries, as well as agricultural machinery. A major petroleum refinery uses oil transported by pipeline from the West Siberian oilfields, and the city's large chemical industry makes fertilizers and dyes. The city's institutions of higher education include the Perm A.M. Gorky State University, founded in 1916.

Etymology
Komi is a member of the Permic branch of the Uralic languages, which is also named for Perm. In Finnish and Vepsian perämaa means "far-away land"; similarly, in Hungarian perem means "edge" or "verge". The geologic period of the Permian takes its name from the toponym.

Geography

The city is located on the bank of the Kama River upon hilly terrain. The Kama is the main tributary of the Volga River and is one of the deepest and most picturesque rivers of Russia. This river is the waterway which grants the Ural Mountains access to the White Sea, Baltic Sea, Sea of Azov, Black Sea, and Caspian Sea. The Kama divides the city into two parts: the central part and the right bank part. The city street grid parallels the Kama River, travelling generally east-west, while other main streets run perpendicularly to those following the river. The grid pattern accommodates the hills of the city where it crosses them.

Another distinguishing feature of the city's relief is the large number of small rivers and brooks. The largest of them are the Mulyanka, the Yegoshikha, the Motovilikha (all are on the left bank of Kama River), and the Gayva (on the right bank).

Perm has a continental climate with warm summers and long, cold winters.

History

Perm is located in the old Permiak area. Perm was first mentioned as the village of Yagoshikha in 1647; however, the history of the modern city of Perm starts with the development of the Ural region by Tsar Peter the Great. Vasily Tatishchev, appointed by the Tsar as a chief manager of Ural factories, founded Perm together with another major centre of the Ural region, Yekaterinburg.

In the 19th century, Perm became a major trade and industrial centre with a population of more than 20,000 people in the 1860s, with several metallurgy, paper, and steamboat producing factories, including one owned by a British entrepreneur. In 1870, an opera theatre was opened in the city, and in 1871 the first phosphoric factory in Russia was built. In 1916, Perm State University—a major educational institution in modern Russia—was opened.

After the outbreak of the Russian Civil War, Perm became a prime target for both sides because of its military munitions factories. It was heavily rumored from July-September  1918 that the Tsarina Alexandra Feodorovna and her four daughters were imprisoned at the perception and Berezine buildings. According to the File on the Tsar, the Grand Duchess Anastasia would have attempted to flee. On December 25, 1918, the Siberian White Army under Anatoly Pepelyayev (who acknowledged the authority of the Omsk Government of Aleksandr Kolchak), took Perm. On July 1, 1919, the city was retaken by the Red Army.

Soviet period
In the 1930s, Perm grew as a major industrial city with aviation, shipbuilding, and chemical factories built during that period. During the Great Patriotic War (World War II), Perm was a vital center of artillery production in the Soviet Union. During the Cold War, Perm became a closed city.

Modern city

The city is a major administrative, industrial, scientific, and cultural centre. The leading industries include machinery, defence, oil production (about 3% of Russian output), oil refining, chemical and petrochemical, timber and wood processing and the food industry.

On 20 September 2021, a mass shooting occurred at Perm State University, resulting in six fatalities and 47 injuries.

Administrative and municipal status
Perm is the administrative centre of the krai and, within the framework of administrative divisions, it also serves as the administrative center of Permsky District, even though it is not a part of it. As an administrative division, it is, together with two rural localities, incorporated separately as the city of krai significance of Perm—an administrative unit with the status equal to that of the districts. As a municipal division, the city of krai significance of Perm is incorporated as Perm Urban Okrug.

City divisions

For administrative purposes, Perm is divided into seven city districts:

Economy
Perm has the largest industrial output among cities in the Urals, ahead of Yekaterinburg, Chelyabinsk and Ufa, although Perm has a smaller population than these. Thirty-five per cent of Perm Oblast's industry is located in Perm. The largest industries in the city are electric power engineering, oil and gas refining, machine building, chemicals and petrochemicals, forestry processing, printing and food industry.

Several major industrial companies are located in Perm: Perm Motors and Aviadvigatel, major suppliers of engines to the Russian aircraft industry; rocket engine company Proton-PM, which will mass-produce the RD-191 engine for the upcoming Angara rocket family; electric engineering firms Morion JSC, Perm Scientific and Industrial Group, and Perm Electrical Engineering Plant; Russia's largest exporter of cables and wires, JSC KAMKABEL; and oil and natural gas companies such as LUKoil-Perm Ltd. and LUKoilPernefteprodukt Ltd.

Transportation

Perm is an important railway junction on the Trans-Siberian Railway with lines radiating to Central Russia, the north part of the Urals, and the far east of Russia. Perm has two major railway stations, the historical Perm I and the modern Perm II. The Kama River is an important direct link between the European part of Russia to the sea ports on the White, Baltic, Azov, Black, and Caspian seas.

Perm's public transit network includes tram, bus, and city-railway routes. The formerly important trolleybus service was discontinued in July 2019.

Proposed metro system
The Perm Metro is a planned construction of a metro system which has been considered. The first plans date back to the 1970s. A feasibility study was compiled in 1990 but economic difficulties during the decade prevented its final planning and construction. The plans were revitalised in the early 2000s, but a lack of funding hampered the project and plans were once again put on hold. Light rail has also been considered.

Culture

The Perm Opera and Ballet House is one of the best in Russia. There are many other theatres in Perm, including the Drama Theater, the Puppet Theatre, the Theatre for Young Spectators, the Theatre "Stage Molot", and the mystical At the Bridge Theatre.

Among the cities museums and galleries, the Perm State Art Gallery is recognised for its outstanding collections of art, including paintings from 15th- to 18th-century art movements, and wooden sculptures from the region. It is housed in a notable early 19th-century structure, once an orthodox cathedral. The spire of the museum towers over the rest of Perm, as it is situated on the Komsomolsky Prospect. Perm is receiving attention from the development of the new Museum of Contemporary Art, Perm Museum of Contemporary Art (PERMM) which officially opened in March 2009.

The RAV Vast steel tongue drum was invented in Perm by Andrey Remyannikov. This instrument is unique in the tongue drum and handpan world because each note has multiple harmonic overtones that resonate with other notes in the drum. The sound consequently has long sustain and reverberation.

The Legend of Perm Bear or The Walking Bear is a sculpture depicting a walking bear, which is also shown on the city's coat of arms. It is situated in the central part of the city on Lenin Street, in front of the Organ Concert Hall and close to the building of Legislative Assembly of Perm Krai. The author of the sculpture is Vladimir Pavlenko, a monumentalist sculptor from Nizhny Tagil, member of the Artists' Union of Russia and UNESCO International Association of Arts.

Education
Perm is a scientific centre; some of the scientific institutes are combined in the Perm Scientific Center of the Ural Branch of the Russian Academy of Sciences.

Perm is a home to several major universities including Perm State University, Perm State Technical University, Perm branch of state university Higher school of economics, Perm State Teachers' Training University, Perm State Medical Academy, Perm State Pharmaceutical Academy, Perm State Agricultural Academy, The Institute of Art and Culture, Perm State Choreographic School, and others. There are also three military schools in Perm.

Education links 
Perm State University
Perm State Technical University
Perm State Pharmaceutical Academy
Perm State Agricultural Academy
Perm State Choreographic School

Climate
Perm has a warm summer continental climate (Köppen: Dfb). Winters are long, snowy and quite cold. Summers are moderately warm with cool nights, although summers are shorter than winters. Due to its far inland location, there is a distinct lack of seasonal lag resulting in rapid cooling down of the warm weather as days get shorter. This is less evident during winter.

Demographics
At the time of the official 2010 Census, the ethnic makeup of the city's population whose ethnicity was known (907,955) was:

Sports
The city hosted 2002 European Amateur Boxing Championships.

In 1995-2008, Perm was the location of the Ural Great basketball team — the only Russian basketball champion besides CSKA.

There is also an amateur bandy team called Kama.

Notable people

The following people were either born in Perm or made names for themselves while residing there.

Tatiana Borodina (born ca.1972), opera soprano
Sergei Diaghilev (1872–1929), ballet impresario
Alexei Ivanov (born 1969) a Russian award-winning writer.
Dmitry Mamin-Sibiryak (1852–1912) a Russian author of novels and short stories set in the Ural Mountains.
Tanya Mityushina (born 1993), model
Nikolay Moiseyev (1902–1955) a Soviet astronomer and expert in celestial mechanics
Andronic Nikolsky (1870–1918), first Russian Orthodox Church Bishop of Kyoto, Japan
Mikhail Osorgin (1878–1942) a Russian writer, journalist and essayist.
Natasha Poly (born 1985), supermodel
Alexander Stepanovich Popov (1859–1905), physicist; regarded locally as the inventor of radio
Dmitry Rybolovlev (born 1966) a Russian oligarch, billionaire businessman and investor
Katerina Shpitsa (born 1985), actress of theatre and cinema
Mikhail Shuisky (1883–1953), baritone opera singer
Arkady Shvetsov (1892-1953), aircraft engine designer
Nikolay Slavyanov (1854–1897), inventor of an early method of arc welding
Peter Struve (1870–1944), political economist, philosopher and editor
Yuri Trutnev (born 1956), politician, Presidential Envoy to the Far Eastern Federal District
Andrey Voronikhin (1759–1814), architect and painter

Sport 
Michael Beilin (born 1976), Israeli Olympic Greco-Roman wrestler
Vladimir Chagin (born 1970), a Russian rally raid driver in the Dakar Rally
Alexandra Kosteniuk (born 1984), 2008 Women's World Chess Champion
Vladimirs Lubkins (born 1963), retired Latvian ice hockey player
Tatiana Totmianina (born 1981), pair skater, 2006 Olympic Champion
Maxim Trankov (born 1983), pairs figure skater
Konstantin Zyryanov (born 1977), footballer with 52 caps for Russia

and

The Nobel-prize-winning writer Boris Pasternak (1890–1960) lived in Perm for a time, and it figures in his novel Doctor Zhivago under the fictional name "Yuriatin" where Yuri sees Lara again in the public library.

Marketing 
Perm is an example of city marketing in Russia, where the city also has a logo.

Twin towns – sister cities

Perm is twinned with:

 Agrigento, Sicily, Italy (2012)
 Amnéville, Moselle,  France (1992)
 Duisburg, North Rhine-Westphalia, Germany (2007)
 Louisville, Kentucky, United States (1994)
 Oxford, Oxfordshire, United Kingdom (1995-2022)
 Qingdao, Shandong,  China (2006)

See also
 Immaculate Conception Church, Perm
 Stephen of Perm

References

Notes

Sources

External links

 
Official website of Perm 
Official website of the Perm City Duma 
Street View of Perm
Perm Chamber of Commerce and Industry
The Western Ural Photographic Album 
Virtual museum of Romanov in Perm
History of Perm
The city of Perm - The poem of the town
Article about Perm Ballet
S. Kishkovsky "Modern Dance and Art Bring a Burst of Color to a Gray City"
Unofficial website of Perm 

 
Permsky Uyezd
Populated places established in 1723
History of Ural
1723 establishments in the Russian Empire
1723 establishments in Europe
 
Populated places on the Kama River